Edwige Feuillère (born Edwige Louise Caroline Cunatti; October 29, 1907 – November 13, 1998) was a French stage and film actress.

Biography
She was born Edwige Louise Caroline Cunatti to an Italian architect father and an Alsace-born mother. She was raised primarily in Dijon. In 1931 she married actor Pierre Feuillère, from whom she separated two years later (1933), but kept his surname. She acted from 1931 until 1995.

Death
She died of natural causes, aged 91.

Selected filmography

1931: La Fine Combine (Short, dir. André Chotin) – Mado, the mistress
1931: Mam'zelle Nitouche (dir Marc Allégret) – Une théâtreuse (uncredited)
1931: The Champion Cook (dir. Alberto Cavalcanti) – Régine
1932: Monsieur Albert (dir. Karl Anton) – Comtesse Peggy Ricardi
1932: La Perle (dir. René Guissart) – Viviane Lancenay
1932: Une petite femme dans le train (dir. Karl Anton) – Adolphine
1932: Maquillage (dir. Karl Anton) – Ketty
1932: Le Beau Rôle (Short, dir. Roger Capellani)
1932: Une étoile disparaît (dir. Robert Villers) – sous réserves
1933: Topaze (dir. Louis Gasnier) – Suzy Courtois
1933: Matricule 33 (dir. Karl Anton) – 'Helena Schweringen
1933: Les Aventures du roi Pausole (dir. Alexis Granowski) – Diane
1933: La Voix de métal (L'appel de nuit) (dir. Youly Marca-Rosa) – Comtesse Viana
1934: Toi, que j'adore (dir. Géza von Bolváry & Albert Valentin) – Jacqueline Boulanger
1934: Ces messieurs de la Santé (dir. Pierre Colombier) – Fernande
1935: Barcarolle (dir. Gerhard Lamprecht & Roger Le Bon) – Giacinta
1935: The Decoy (dir. Hans Steinhoff & Roger Le Bon) – Délia
1935: Golgotha (dir. Julien Duvivier) – Claudia Procula
1935: Stradivarius (dir. Albert Valentin & Géza von Bolváry) – Maria Belloni
1935: Lucrezia Borgia (dir. Abel Gance) – Lucrezia Borgia
1935: La Route heureuse (dir. Georges Lacombe) – Suzanne
1936: Compliments of Mister Flow (dir. Robert Siodmak) – Lady Héléna Scarlett
1936: Amore (Italian version of the previous film, dir. Carlo L. Bragaglia) – Suzanne
1937: Marthe Richard, au service de la France (dir. Raymond Bernard) – Marthe Richard
1937: Woman of Malacca (dir. Marc Allégret) – Audrey Greenwood
1937: Feu! (dir. Jacques de Baroncelli) – Edwige Elno
1938: I Was an Adventuress (dir. Raymond Bernard) – Véra Vronsky
1939: There's No Tomorrow (dir. Max Ophüls) – Evelyne
1940: The Emigrant (dir. Léo Joannon) – Christiane Vallier
1940: Sarajevo (dir. Max Ophüls) – Comtesse Sophie Choteck
1942: Mam'zelle Bonaparte (dir. Maurice Tourneur) – Cora Pearl, the courtesan
1942: La Duchesse de Langeais (dir. Jacques de Baroncelli) – Antoinette de Langeais
1942: L'Honorable Catherine (dir. Marcel L'Herbier) – Catherine Roussel
1943: Lucrèce (dir. Léo Joannon) – Lucrèce, the celebrated actress
1945: La Part de l'ombre (dir. Jean Delannoy) – Agnès Noblet
1946: Tant que je vivrai (dir. Jacques de Baroncelli) – Ariane
1946: The Idiot (dir. Georges Lampin) – Nastasia Philipovna
1946: Once is Enough (dir. Andrée Feix) – Christine Jourdan, sculptor
1947: The Eagle with Two Heads (dir. Jean Cocteau) – Queen Natascha
1948: Woman Hater (dir. Terence Young) – Colette Marly
1948: La Norvège sans les vikings (documentary she produced)
1949: Julie de Carneilhan (dir. Jacques Manuel) – Julie de Carneilhan
1950: Lost Souvenirs (dir. Christian-Jaque) – Florence (segment "Une statuette d'Osiris")
1951: Olivia (dir. Jacqueline Audry) – Mlle Julie
1951: The Cape of Hope (dir. Raymond Bernard) – Lyria, landlady of the "Sea-Bar"
1952: Adorables Créatures (dir. Christian-Jaque) – Denise Aubusson, the elegant widow
1954: Le Blé en herbe (dir. Claude Autant-Lara) – Mme Camille Dalleray, the woman in white
1955: Les Fruits de l'été (dir. Raymond Bernard) – Sabine Gravières, the antique dealer
1957: The Seventh Commandment (dir. Raymond Bernard) – Princess Nadia Vronskaïa
1957: Quand la femme s'en mêle (dir. Yves Allégret) – Maine, former wife of Félix
1958: En cas de malheur (dir. Claude Autant-Lara) – Viviane Gobillot, the wife of André
1958 Life Together (dir. Clément Duhour) – Françoise Sellier, ex: Carreau
1961: Les Amours célèbres (an anthology film inspired by the comic strips of Paul Gordeaux, dir. Michel Boisrond) – Mademoiselle Raucourt (segment "Les comédiennes)
1962: Le Crime ne paie pas (an anthology film inspired by the comic strips of Paul Gordeaux, dir. Gérard Oury) – Dona Lucrezia (segment "Le masque")
1964: Aimez-vous les femmes ? (dir. Jean Léon) – Aunt Flo
1964: La Bonne Occase (dir. Michel Drach) – Comtesse de Saint-Plas
1967: La Route d'un homme (TV Short, dir. Georges Hacquard) – Récitante / Narrator (voice)
1968: Et si on faisait l'amour ("Sensi facciamo l'amore") (dir. Vittorio Caprioli) – Giuditta Passani
1970: OSS 117 prend des vacances (dir. Pierre Kalfon) – Comtesse de Labarthe
1970: Clair de Terre (dir. Guy Gilles) – Mme Larivière
1975: La Chair de l'orchidée (dir. Patrice Chéreau) – Mme Bastier-Wegener
1982: Cher menteur (TV Movie)
1993: Dis papa, raconte-moi là-bas (dir. Guy Gilles) – (voice)

References

External links

Edwige Feuillère at filmreference.com

1907 births
1998 deaths
20th-century French actresses
People from Vesoul
French film actresses
French stage actresses
French people of Italian descent
Troupe of the Comédie-Française
César Honorary Award recipients